Skinheads USA: Soldiers of the Race War is a 1993 HBO documentary film about a group of white power skinheads involved in the neo-Nazi movement in the southern state of Alabama. It features the white supremacist Bill Riccio, then-leader of the Aryan Youth Front. Other Klan organizations are also featured.

The film was directed by Shari Cookson and produced by Dave Bell.

Cast
 Bill Riccio as himself
 Mark Lane as himself
 Frank Meeink as himself
 Christian Picciolini as himself

References

External links
 

American documentary films
HBO documentary films
1993 television films
1993 films
Neo-Nazism in the United States
Skinhead films
1990s gang films
1993 documentary films
1990s English-language films
Films directed by Shari Cookson
1990s American films